Blake L. Sartini (born January 16, 1959) is an American entrepreneur in the Nevada gaming and entertainment industry.

He is Chairman, President and CEO of Golden Entertainment, Inc., an owner and operator of distributed gaming, taverns and casinos based in Las Vegas, Nevada.  
It was formed in 2015 by the merger of Golden Gaming (founded in 2001 by Blake Sartini) and Lakes Entertainment. The Golden Entertainment, Inc. owns and operates gaming properties across two divisions – distributed gaming and resort and casino operations. Golden Entertainment, Inc. operates more than 12,000 gaming devices and over 30 table games in Nevada, Maryland and Montana. The company owns four casino properties, over 55 taverns and operates approximately 980 distributed gaming locations in Nevada, Maryland and Montana. In June 2017, Golden agreed to purchase American Casino & Entertainment Properties for $850 million, which would expand the company's casino portfolio by four: the Stratosphere Las Vegas, Arizona Charlie's Boulder, Arizona Charlie's Decatur, and the Aquarius Casino Resort. The transaction closed in October 2017 and Golden owns and operates eight casino-resort properties - seven in Nevada and one in Maryland. In March 2018, Sartini and Golden Entertainment announced plans for a $140 million renovation of the Stratosphere Las Vegas that will be completed in three phases. In January 2019, Golden Entertainment closed on its $190 million deal to acquire two Laughlin casinos, Colorado Belle and Edgewater.

Early life 
Blake L. Sartini was born in Stockton, in the San Joaquin County of California. He is the son of Arthur Dennis Sartini and Sandra Louise Myers. He attended junior college in Stockton, and in 1964, when Blake was 5 years old, Arthur took a job as the assistant executive director of the Las Vegas Housing Authority.

Education 
Sartini attended Ed W. Clark High School, where he played football as a tight end and defensive end. 
He enrolled in the University of Nevada, Las Vegas and in 1982 earned his bachelor's degree in Business Administration.

Career

Gaming History 

Sartini began his career as a craps dealer in a downtown Las Vegas hotel and casino.  Following, he worked in various management and executive management positions with several gaming and entertainment companies. His career included working on the Las Vegas strip at the Barbary Coast Hotel and Casino and ultimately joining Station Casinos Inc.,where he held the positions of Chief Operating Officer and Director.  He was one of the four founding members when it became a public entity in May 1993. Under Sartini’s leadership the company grew from one property with 2,000 team members and $150 million in revenue to eight casinos with 12,000 team members and $850 million in revenue.

Golden Gaming/Golden Entertainment 

Throughout the 1990s Sartini served as president of the Station Casinos subsidiary Southwest Gaming Services, a slot route operator that he founded in 1985. In 2001, he acquired the company from Station Casinos and it became Golden Route Operations, a division of Golden Gaming, LLC.

In 2002, he formed the Golden Tavern Group subsidiary — now known as PT’s Entertainment Group — and acquired the PT’s chain of taverns. It is now the largest tavern operator in Nevada, with over 55 establishments including PT’s, Sean Patrick's Irish Pub & Grill, Sierra Gold and SG Bar.

The third division is the Golden Casino Group, which consists of the Pahrump Nugget Hotel & Casino, the Gold Town Casino and the Lakeside Casino and RV Park in Pahrump, Nevada and Rocky Gap Casino and Resort in Flintstone, Maryland.

The Gold Town and Lakeside Casino and RV Park were purchased as part of a larger deal in March 2012 with Affinity Gaming that made Golden Gaming the largest casino operator in Nye County, and also (through Affinity’s slot route business) the largest slot route operator in Nevada.
In January 2013, the Nevada Gaming Commission approved the issue of an interactive gaming license to Sartini Synergy Online, the interactive arm of Golden Gaming.

The company expanded into Montana in 2016, purchasing slot routes with 2,800 machines for a total of $45 million.

In June 2017, Golden agreed to purchase American Casino & Entertainment Properties for $850 million, which would expand the company's casino portfolio by four: the Stratosphere Las Vegas, Arizona Charlie's Boulder, Arizona Charlie's Decatur, and the Aquarius Casino Resort. The transaction is expected to close in the fourth quarter of 2017 and Golden will own and operate eight casino-resorts - seven in Nevada and one on Maryland.
 
In June 2017, Golden Entertainment was granted a gaming license by the Illinois Gaming Board to operate video gaming terminals at bars, restaurants, truck stops and fraternal and veterans organizations. This marked the fourth state Golden is licensed.

In October 2017, Golden Entertainment closed its $850 million purchase of American Casino & Entertainment Properties which expanded the company's casino portfolio by four: the Stratosphere Las Vegas, Arizona Charlie's Boulder, Arizona Charlie's Decatur, and the Aquarius Casino Resort.

In January 2019, Golden Entertainment closed its $190 million acquisition of Laughlin properties, Colorado Belle and Edgewater.

Sartini Enterprises and Service1st Bank 

In addition to his gaming and entertainment interests, Sartini is also founder, chairman and CEO of Sartini Enterprises, Inc. a family investment company established in 2007.

In 2007, Sartini co-founded a startup bank called Service1st Bank of Nevada.

The bank was acquired in September 2009 by Global Consumer Acquisition Corp., which soon became Western Liberty Bancorp. Western Liberty in turn was purchased by Western Alliance, the parent company of Bank of Nevada, in August 2012.
As its largest shareholder, Sartini was also a board member of Service1st through its acquisition and took a director role after its acquisition, which he served through 2011.

Philanthropy 

Sartini started the Sartini Family Foundation to enable charitable donations and has made significant contributions to the following organizations: 

 Bishop Gorman High School
 Nevada Cancer Institute
 Lou Ruvo Center for Brain Health
 Nathan Adelson Hospice
 Stillpoint Spiritual Center
 Opportunity Village
 Public Education Foundation
 University of Nevada, Las Vegas
 Shane Victorino Foundation
 Kurt Busch Foundation

Sartini was the chair of the capital campaign for Bishop Gorman High School which raised over $50 million. This was put toward the construction of a new campus.
He is also a member of the Board of Trustees of the University of Nevada, Las Vegas (UNLV) Foundation.

Personal life 

Sartini has been married to his wife Delise since 1983. They have three children: Blake Jr., Lorenzo, and Sandra.

References

External links 
 Golden Gaming, Inc.

American chief executives of travel and tourism industry companies
American casino industry businesspeople
People from the Las Vegas Valley
Living people
1959 births